Monosodium xenate is the sodium salt of xenic acid with formula NaHXeO4·1.5H2O. It is a powerful oxidizer. It is a highly reactive compound of xenon. The dialkali xenates do not appear to exist, as xenate disproportionates in more alkaline conditions.

Synthesis 
Monosodium xenate can be made by mixing solutions of xenon trioxide and sodium hydroxide, followed by freezing to liquid nitrogen temperatures, and dehydrating in a vacuum.

Properties
Monosodium xenate is stable when heated to 160 °C in a pure state.  However it can explode when subjected to mechanical shock, or lower temperatures when mixed with XeO3.
Sodium xenate is slightly toxic with a medium lethal dose between 15 and 30 mg/kg of body weight in mice. Xenate leaves the body very quickly.  In mice, the level in blood drops by half in twenty seconds due to it being decomposed and exhaled. In the peritoneum the half-life extends to six minutes.

References 

Xenon(VI) compounds
Oxidizing agents
Sodium compounds